Turnback Township is an inactive township in Lawrence County, in the U.S. state of Missouri.

Turnback Township was named after Turnback Creek.

References

Townships in Missouri
Townships in Lawrence County, Missouri